Aurora is a town on the west coast of South Africa situated 43 kilometres north-west of Piketberg and 29km south of Redelinghuys. Established in 1906, it was named after the Roman goddess of dawn.

References 

Populated places in the Bergrivier Local Municipality